Group B of the 1999 FIFA Women's World Cup took place from June 19 to 27, 1999. The group consisted of Brazil, Germany, Italy and Mexico.

Standings

Matches
All times listed are local time.

Brazil vs Mexico

Germany vs Italy

Brazil vs Italy

Germany vs Mexico

Germany vs Brazil

Mexico vs Italy

References

External links
FIFA Women's World Cup USA 1999 at FIFA.com

1999 FIFA Women's World Cup
Brazil at the 1999 FIFA Women's World Cup
Germany at the 1999 FIFA Women's World Cup
Italy at the 1999 FIFA Women's World Cup
Mexico at the 1999 FIFA Women's World Cup